Antimonate minerals are those minerals containing the antimonate (SbO43−) anion group. Both the Dana and the Strunz mineral classifications place the antimonates in with the phosphate minerals.

References